A by-election was held for the New South Wales Legislative Assembly electorate of Sturt on 13 January 1917 following the resignation of John Cann who resigned to take the position of assistant commissioner of the New South Wales Government Railways. Cann had been elected as a  candidate at the 1913 election, however he was expelled from the party for voting against Labor's censure motion on 10 November 1916.

Dates

Results

				

John Cann resigned.

See also
Electoral results for the district of Sturt (New South Wales)
List of New South Wales state by-elections

References

1917 elections in Australia
New South Wales state by-elections
1910s in New South Wales